The Austro-Hungarian Navy (Kaiserliche und Königliche Kriegsmarine, shortened to k.u.k. Kriegsmarine) built a series of U-boats between 1907 and 1918 to defend its coastline and project naval power into the Adriatic and Mediterranean Seas in wartime. With the establishment of the Austrian Naval League in September 1904 and the appointment of Vice-Admiral Rudolf Montecuccoli to the post of Chief of the Naval Section of the War Ministry in October that same year, the k.u.k. Kriegsmarine began a program of naval expansion befitting a Great Power. Montecuccoli immediately pursued the efforts championed by his predecessor, Admiral Hermann von Spaun, and pushed to greatly expand and modernize the Austro-Hungarian Navy. By the spring of 1905, Montecuccoli envisioned a modern Austrian fleet of 12 battleships, four armoured cruisers, eight scout cruisers, 18 destroyers, 36 high seas torpedo craft, and six submarines.

The Austro-Hungarian U-boat fleet during the First World War mainly consisted of German designs built under licence and purchased units transported by rail from Germany's northern shipyards to the Austrian ports on the Adriatic Sea. They served throughout the war against Italian, French and British shipping in the Mediterranean Sea with some success, losing 8 of the 28 boats in service in return. Following the end of the war in 1918, all Austrian submarines were surrendered to the Entente powers, who disposed of them individually.  As both Austria and Hungary became landlocked in the aftermath of the war, no Austrian or Hungarian submarines (or any other naval vessels) have been commissioned since.

In some sources Austro-Hungarian U-boats are referenced with Roman numerals as a way to distinguish them from German U-boats with similar numbers, but the Austro-Hungarian Navy itself used Arabic numerals. There are gaps in the numbering for several reasons. One series of Austro-Hungarian U-boats under construction in Germany was sold and commissioned into the Imperial German Navy. In other cases, U-boats commissioned into the Imperial German Navy were temporarily assigned Austro-Hungarian numbers when they operated in the Mediterranean. One final reason, in the case of the unassigned U-13, was superstition.

Austro-Hungarian U-boats

Commissioned

Other
Submarines on which construction was begun but which were not completed or commissioned during World War I are included in this table.

German U-boats operating under the Austro-Hungarian flag 
After Italy had entered World War I by declaring war on Austria-Hungary on 23 May 1915, Germany felt treaty-bound to support the Austrians in attacks against Italian ships, even though Germany and Italy were not officially at war. As a result, German U-boats operating in Mediterranean were assigned Austro-Hungarian numbers and flags. In some cases the same Austro-Hungarian numbers were assigned to different German U-boats. After 28 August 1916, when Germany and Italy were officially at war, the practice continued, primarily to avoid charges of flag misuse. The practice was largely ended by 1 October 1916 except for a few large U-boats that continued using Austro-Hungarian numbers.

Notes

References

Bibliography 
Jane's Fighting Ships of World War One, Originally published 1919, Republished by Random House Ltd, Great Britain: 1990. .

External links
naval-history.net information page on Austrian submarines
Erwin Sieche The Austro-Hungarian Submarine Force

Austria-Hungary
 
Austro-Hungarian military-related lists